Shizar may refer to:

Shizar, Qazvin
Shizar, Takestan
Shizar Rural District, in Kermanshah Province